The 2022–23 Pittsburgh Penguins season is the 56th season for the National Hockey League team that was established on June 5, 1967.

This season, Alex Nylander made a comeback after not playing NHL hockey in two years.

Standings

Divisional standings

Conference standings

Schedule and results

Preseason
The Preseason schedule was released on June 30, 2022.

|- style="background:#cfc;"
| 1 || September 25 ||  Columbus|| 2–3  || Pittsburgh || PPG Paints Arena || 17,805 || 1–0–0
|- style="background:#fcf;"
| 2  || September 25 || Pittsburgh || 1–5 || Columbus || Nationwide Arena || 14,308 || 1–1–0
|- style="background:#fcf;"
| 3 || September 27 || Detroit || 6–2 || Pittsburgh || PPG Paints Arena || 13,020 || 1–2–0
|- style="background:#fcf;"
| 4 || October 1 || Pittsburgh || 1–3 || Buffalo || KeyBank Center || 10,908 || 1–3–0
|- style="background:#cfc;"
| 5 || October 3 || Pittsburgh || 3–2 || Detroit || Little Caesars Arena || 13,328 || 2–3–0
|- style="background:#cfc;"
| 6 || October 7 || Buffalo || 1–7 || Pittsburgh || PPG Paints Arena || 14,350 || 3–3–0 
|-

|- style="text-align:center;"
| Legend:       = Win       = Loss       = OT/SO Loss
 – Split Squad

Regular season
The regular season schedule was released on July 6, 2022. 

|- style="background:#cfc;"
| 1 || October 13 || Arizona || 2–6 || Pittsburgh || Jarry || 18,355 || 1–0–0 || 2 || 
|- style="background:#cfc;"
| 2 || October 15 || Tampa Bay || 2–6 || Pittsburgh || Jarry || 18,416 || 2–0–0 || 4 || 
|- style="background:#ffc;"
| 3 || October 17 || Pittsburgh || 2–3  || Montreal || DeSmith || 21,105 || 2–0–1 || 5 || 
|- style="background:#cfc;"
| 4 || October 20 || Los Angeles || 1–6 || Pittsburgh || Jarry || 17,136 || 3–0–1 || 7 || 
|- style="background:#cfc;"
| 5 || October 22 || Pittsburgh || 6–3 || Columbus || Jarry || 18,051 || 4–0–1 || 9 || 
|- style="background:#fcf;"
| 6 || October 24 || Pittsburgh || 3–6 || Edmonton || Jarry || 17,392 || 4–1–1 || 9 || 
|- style="background:#fcf;"
| 7 || October 25 || Pittsburgh || 1–4 || Calgary || DeSmith || 17,628 || 4–2–1 || 9 || 
|- style="background:#fcf;"
| 8 || October 28 || Pittsburgh || 1–5 || Vancouver || Jarry || 18,528 || 4–3–1 || 9 || 
|- style="background:#fcf;"
| 9 || October 29 || Pittsburgh || 1–3 || Seattle || DeSmith || 17,151 || 4–4–1 || 9 || 
|-

|- style="background:#ffc;"
| 10 || November 1 || Boston || 6–5  || Pittsburgh || Jarry || 17,629 || 4–4–2 || 10 || 
|- style="background:#fcf;"
| 11 || November 2 || Pittsburgh || 3–6 || Buffalo || DeSmith || 12,201 || 4–5–2 || 10 || 
|- style="background:#fcf
| 12 || November 5 || Seattle || 3–2 || Pittsburgh || Jarry || 18,302 || 4–6–2 || 10 || 
|- style="background:#cfc
| 13 || November 9 || Pittsburgh || 4–1 || Washington || DeSmith || 18,573 || 5–6–2 || 12 || 
|- style="background:#cfc
| 14 || November 11 || Pittsburgh || 4–2 || Toronto  || DeSmith || 19,229 || 6–6–2 || 14 || 
|- style="background:#ffc
| 15 || November 12 || Pittsburgh || 4–5  || Montreal || Jarry || 21,105 || 6–6–3 || 15 || 
|- style="background:#fcf
| 16 || November 15 || Toronto || 5–2 || Pittsburgh || DeSmith || 17,035 || 6–7–3 || 15 || 
|- style="background:#cfc
| 17 || November 17 || Pittsburgh || 6–4 || Minnesota || Jarry || 18,224 || 7–7–3 || 17 || 
|- style="background:#cfc
| 18 || November 19 || Pittsburgh || 3–0 || Winnipeg  || Jarry || 15,325 || 8–7–3 || 19 || 
|- style="background:#cfc
| 19 || November 20 || Pittsburgh || 5–3 || Chicago || DeSmith || 21,182 || 9–7–3 || 21 || 
|- style="background:#cfc
| 20 || November 23 || Calgary || 1–2  || Pittsburgh || Jarry || 18,149 || 10–7–3 || 23 || 
|- style="background:#cfc
| 21 || November 25 || Pittsburgh || 4–1 || Philadelphia || Jarry || 19,309 || 11–7–3 || 25 || 
|- style="background:#fcf
| 22 || November 26 || Toronto || 4–1 || Pittsburgh || DeSmith || 18,166 || 11–8–3 || 25 || 
|- style="background:#ffc
| 23 || November 29 || Carolina || 3–2  || Pittsburgh || Jarry || 15,942 || 11–8–4 || 26 || 

|- style="background:#cfc
| 24 || December 1 || Vegas || 3–4 || Pittsburgh || Jarry || 15,895 || 12–8–4 || 28 || 
|- style="background:#cfc
| 25 || December 3 || St. Louis || 2–6 || Pittsburgh || Jarry || 17,330 || 13–8–4 || 30 || 
|- style="background:#cfc
| 26 || December 6 || Columbus || 1–4 || Pittsburgh || Jarry || 15,867 || 14–8–4 || 32 || 
|- style="background:#cfc
| 27 || December 9 || Pittsburgh || 4–3  || Buffalo || Jarry || 17,205 || 15–8–4 || 34 || 
|- style="background:#cfc
| 28 || December 10 || Buffalo || 1–3 || Pittsburgh || DeSmith || 18,414 || 16–8–4 || 36 || 
|- style="background:#cfc
| 29 || December 12 || Dallas || 1–2 || Pittsburgh || Jarry || 17,147 || 17–8–4 || 38 || 
|- style="background:#cfc
| 30 || December 15 || Pittsburgh || 4–2 || Florida || Jarry || 14,538 || 18–8–4 || 40 || 
|- style="background:#fcf
| 31 || December 18 || Pittsburgh || 2–3 || Carolina || DeSmith || 18,117 || 18–9–4 || 40 || 
|- style="background:#cfc
| 32 || December 20 || NY Rangers || 2–3 || Pittsburgh || Jarry || 18,005 || 19–9–4 || 42 || 
|- style="background:#ffc
| 33 || December 22 || Carolina || 4–3  || Pittsburgh || Jarry || 18,075 || 19–9–5 || 43 || 
|- style="background:#fcf
| 34 || December 27 || Pittsburgh || 1–5 || NY Islanders || Jarry || 17,255 || 19–10–5 || 43 || 
|- style="background:#ffc
| 35 || December 28 || Detroit || 5–4  || Pittsburgh || DeSmith || 18,387 || 19–10–6 || 44 || 
|- style="background:#fcf
| 36 || December 30 || New Jersey || 4–2 || Pittsburgh || Jarry || 18,387 || 19–11–6 || 44 || 
|-

|- style="background:#fcf;"
| 37 || January 2 || Pittsburgh || 1–2 || Boston || DeSmith || 39,243(outdoors) || 19–12–6 ||  44 || 
|- style="background:#fcf;"
| 38 || January 5 || Pittsburgh || 2–5 || Vegas || DeSmith || 18,149 || 19–13–6 || 44 || 
|- style="background:#cfc;"
| 39 || January 8 || Pittsburgh || 4–1 || Arizona || DeSmith || 4,600 || 20–13–6 || 46 || 
|- style="background:#cfc;"
| 40 || January 10 || Vancouver || 4–5 || Pittsburgh || Tokarski || 17,986 || 21–13–6 || 48 || 
|- style="background:#fcf;"
| 41 || January 13 || Winnipeg || 4–1 || Pittsburgh || Tokarski || 18,268 || 21–14–6 || 48 || 
|- style="background:#fcf;"
| 42 || January 14 || Pittsburgh || 1–2 || Carolina || DeSmith || 18,769 || 21–15–6 || 48 || 
|- style="background:#cfc;"
| 43 || January 16 || Anaheim || 3–4  || Pittsburgh || DeSmith || 17,784 || 22–15–6 || 50 || 
|- style="background:#ffc;"
| 44 || January 18 || Pittsburgh || 4–5 || Ottawa || DeSmith || 17,106 || 22–15–7 || 51 || 
|- style="background:#cfc;"
| 45 || January 20 || Ottawa || 1–4 || Pittsburgh || Jarry || 18,237 || 23–15–7 || 53 || 
|- style="background:#ffc;"
| 46 || January 22 || Pittsburgh || 1–2  || New Jersey || Jarry || 16,514 || 23–15–8 || 54 || 
|- style="background:#cfc;"
| 47 || January 24 || Florida || 6–7  || Pittsburgh || DeSmith || 17,159 || 24–15–8 || 56 || 
|- style="background:#ffc;"
| 48 || January 26 || Pittsburgh || 2–3  || Washington || DeSmith || 18,573 || 24–15–9 || 57 || 
|- style="background:#fcf;"
| 49 || January 28 || San Jose || 6–4 || Pittsburgh || DeSmith || 18,417 || 24–16–9 || 57 || 
|-

|- style="background:#cfc;"
| 50 || February 7 || Colorado || 1–2  || Pittsburgh || DeSmith || 18,096 || 25–16–9 || 59 || 
|- style="background:#cfc;"
| 51 || February 10 || Pittsburgh || 6–3 || Anaheim || DeSmith || 15,026 || 26–16–9 || 61 || 
|- style="background:#fcf;"
| 52 || February 11 || Pittsburgh || 0–6 || Los Angeles || DeSmith || 18,230 || 26–17–9 || 61 || 
|- style="background:#cfc;"
| 53 || February 14 || Pittsburgh || 3–1 || San Jose || DeSmith || 13,534 || 27–17–9 || 63 || 
|- style="background:#fcf;"
| 54 || February 17 || Pittsburgh || 4–5 || NY Islanders || DeSmith || 17,255 || 27–18–9 || 63 || 
|- style="background:#fcf;"
| 55 || February 18 || New Jersey || 5–2 || Pittsburgh || Tokarski || 18,427 || 27–19–9 || 63 || 
|- style="background:#fcf;"
| 56 || February 20 || NY Islanders || 4–2 || Pittsburgh || Jarry || 18,094 || 27–20–9 || 63 || 
|- style="background:#fcf;"
| 57 || February 23 || Edmonton || 7–2 || Pittsburgh || Jarry || 18,400 || 27–21–9 || 63 || 
|- style="background:#cfc;"
| 58 || February 25 || Pittsburgh || 3–2  || St. Louis || Jarry || 18,096 || 28–21–9 || 65 || 
|- style="background:#cfc;"
| 59 || February 26 || Tampa Bay || 3–7 || Pittsburgh || DeSmith || 17,691 || 29–21–9 || 67 || 
|- style="background:#cfc;"
| 60 || February 28 || Pittsburgh || 3–1 || Nashville || Jarry || 17,435 || 30–21–9 || 69 || 
|-

|- style="background:#cfc;"
| 61 || March 2 || Pittsburgh || 5–4  || Tampa Bay || Jarry || 19,092 || 31–21–9 || 71 || 
|- style="background:#fcf;"
| 62 || March 4 || Pittsburgh || 1–4 || Florida || DeSmith || 16,581 || 31–22–9 ||  71 || 
|- style="background:#cfc;"
| 63 || March 7 || Columbus || 4–5  || Pittsburgh || DeSmith || 17,400 || 32–22–9 || 73 || 
|- style="background:#ffc;"
| 64 || March 9 || NY Islanders || 4–3  || Pittsburgh || Jarry || 17,557 || 32–22–10 || 74 || 
|- style="background:#cfc;"
| 65 || March 11 || Philadelphia || 1–5 || Pittsburgh || DeSmith || 18,254 || 33–22–10 || 76 || 
|- style="background:#cfc;"
| 66 || March 12 || NY Rangers || 2–3  || Pittsburgh || Jarry || 18,364 || 34–22–10 || 78 || 
|- style="background:#fcf;"
| 67 || March 14 || Montreal || 6–4 || Pittsburgh || DeSmith || 17,185 || 34–23–10 || 78 || 
|- style="background:#fcf;"
| 68 || March 16 || Pittsburgh || 2–4 || NY Rangers || Jarry || 18,006 || 34–24–10 || 78 || 
|- style="background:#;"
| 69 || March 18 || Pittsburgh || – || NY Rangers ||  ||  ||  ||  || 
|- style="background:#;"
| 70 || March 20 || Ottawa || – || Pittsburgh ||  ||  ||  ||  || 
|- style="background:#;"
| 71 || March 22 || Pittsburgh || – || Colorado ||  ||  ||  ||  || 
|- style="background:#;"
| 72 || March 23 || Pittsburgh || – || Dallas ||  ||  ||  ||  || 
|- style="background:#;"
| 73 || March 25 || Washington || – || Pittsburgh ||  ||  ||  ||  || 
|- style="background:#;"
| 74 || March 28 || Pittsburgh || – || Detroit ||  ||  ||  ||  || 
|- style="background:#;"
| 75 || March 30 || Nashville || – || Pittsburgh ||  ||  ||  ||  || 
|-

|- style="background:#fff;"
| 76 || April 1 || Boston || 0–0 || Pittsburgh ||  || 0 || 0–0–0 || 0 || 
|- style="background:#fff;"
| 77 || April 2 || Philadelphia || 0–0 || Pittsburgh ||  || 0 || 0–0–0 || 0 || 
|- style="background:#fff;"
| 78 || April 4 || Pittsburgh || 0–0 || New Jersey ||  || 0 || 0–0–0 || 0 || 
|- style="background:#fff;"
| 79 || April 6 || Minnesota || 0–0 || Pittsburgh ||  || 0 || 0–0–0 || 0 || 
|- style="background:#fff;"
| 80 || April 8 || Pittsburgh || 0–0 || Detroit ||  || 0 || 0–0–0 || 0 || 
|- style="background:#fff;"
| 81 || April 11 || Chicago || 0–0 || Pittsburgh ||  || 0 || 0–0–0 || 0 || 
|- style="background:#fff;"
| 82 || April 13 || Pittsburgh || 0–0 || Columbus ||  || 0 || 0–0–0 || 0 || 
|- 

|- style="text-align:center;"
| Legend:       = Win       = Loss       = OT/SO Loss

Roster

Transactions
The Penguins have been involved in the following transactions during the 2022–23 season.

Key:

 Contract is entry-level.
 Contract initially takes effect in the 2023–24 season.

Trades

Players acquired

Players lost

Signings

Draft Picks

Below are the Pittsburgh Penguins' selections at the 2022 NHL Entry Draft, which was held on July 7 to 8, 2022, at Bell Centre in Montreal.

References

Pittsburgh Penguins seasons
Penguins
2022 in sports in Pennsylvania
2023 in sports in Pennsylvania